Aaron Joseph Douglas Mauger (last name pronounced "Major"; born 29 November 1980) is a New Zealand professional rugby union coach and former player. He played at centre for Leicester Tigers.

Playing career
Born in Christchurch, Mauger played first five-eighth and second five-eighth for Canterbury (Air New Zealand Cup), the Crusaders (Super Rugby) and the All Blacks. He joined the Leicester Tigers at the end of the 2007 Rugby World Cup after signing a two-and-a-half-year contract with the English side.

Mauger captained the New Zealand under-21 team to success in the international under-21 tournaments in 2000 and 2001. He made his All Blacks debut in 2001.

He is the younger brother of Nathan Mauger and his uncles are former All Blacks Graeme Bachop and Stephen Bachop. His great-uncle, Ivan Mauger, was a six-time Speedway World Champion.

In March 2010, Mauger announced his retirement due to a back injury.
He had attended clinics in the United Kingdom and Germany in his bid to overcome the injury but had been unable to complete training sessions without breaking down.

Coaching
In June 2010, Mauger returned with his family to live in his native New Zealand, where he hoped to remain involved with rugby union in a coaching role. Following a period of coaching with the Crusaders, it was announced that Mauger had signed a three-year deal (starting in the 2015–16 season) with Leicester Tigers for the vacant head coach role. The role was previously held by Matt O'Connor who left in 2013 to be head coach at Leinster.

Highlanders

On 1 August 2017 Mauger was named head coach of the Highlanders, taking over from previous head coach Tony Brown.

For the 2018 Super Rugby season the Highlanders won 10 of 16 games, with points for 437 to 445 against, to be placed 6th. They lost to the New South Wales Waratahs 23–30 in their Quarter Final match at Sydney. His assistant coaches were Mark Hammett and Glenn Delaney.

In the 2019 season the Highlanders under Mauger won 6 and drew 2 matches (Chiefs, Bulls) and were awarded a 0–0 draw for their scheduled match against the Crusaders which was cancelled due to the Christchurch Mosque shootings. This placed them 8th. The points scored were 441 and 392 against. They lost their Quarter final to the eventual champions, the Crusaders, by 14–38 at Christchurch. Clarke Dermody had joined Hammett and Delaney as an Assistant Coach.

In a 2020 season disrupted by COVID-19, the Highlanders won 1 (the Brumbies at Canberra) of their 5 Super Rugby games and they were awarded a 0–0 draw for their cancelled match against the Jaguares. They had a points for and against deficit of 91 to 163, prior to cessation of that competition.  During Super Rugby Aotearoa the Highlanders were 4th after winning 3 from 8 and a points deficit of 197 points for to 227 against.  Riki Flutey had joined as assistant coach.

Mauger's head coach position was not renewed and he was replaced by Tony Brown.

References

External links 
 
 Tigers profile

1980 births
New Zealand rugby union players
New Zealand rugby union coaches
New Zealand sportspeople of Cook Island descent
New Zealand sportspeople of Samoan descent
New Zealand people of French Polynesian descent
New Zealand international rugby union players
New Zealand expatriate sportspeople in England
Canterbury rugby union players
Crusaders (rugby union) players
Leicester Tigers players
Rugby union centres
Rugby union fly-halves
People educated at Christchurch Boys' High School
Living people
Leicester Tigers coaches
Bachop-Mauger family